Laws regarding euthanasia or assisted suicide in Australia are matters for state and territory governments. As of May 2022 all states have passed legislation creating an assisted suicide scheme for eligible individuals. These laws typically refer to assisted suicide as "voluntary assisted dying".

Voluntary assisted dying schemes have been in effect in the following states; Victoria since 19 June 2019, Western Australia since 1 July 2021, Tasmania since 23 October 2022, Queensland since 1 January 2023, and South Australia since 31 January 2023. New South Wales was the final state to pass legislation for assisted dying in May 2022, which will go into effect on 28 November 2023. 

Voluntary euthanasia and assisted suicide was outlawed in all territories of Australia under federal law enacted in 1997, but this was repealed in December 2022 with the passing of the Restoring Territory Rights Act.

Euthanasia was legal for a period between 1996 and 1997 in the Northern Territory, until a federal law overturning the territory law (and removing the right of territories to legislate on euthanasia) was passed.

Throughout Australia a patient can elect not to receive any treatment for a terminal illness and can also elect to have their life support turned off. Advance care planning is also available throughout Australia.

History 

Although historically it was usually a crime to assist in euthanasia and suicide, prosecutions were rare. In 2010, the New South Wales Court of Criminal Appeal quashed a manslaughter conviction of a Sydney woman who had previously been found guilty of killing her partner of 18 years with a euthanasia drug. In 2002, relatives and friends who provided moral support to an elderly woman who committed suicide were extensively investigated by police, but no charges were laid. The Howard Government oversaw the passage of the Criminal Code Amendment (Suicide Related Material Offences) Act 2005, which passed the Federal Parliament in June 2005, and made it a crime to use a telephone, fax, email or internet carriage service to discuss the practicalities of suicide-related material. The law, which remains in effect as of July 2020, prompted the Victorian Health Minister to recommend doctors discuss voluntary assisted dying exclusively in person with their patients, so they would not run foul of the federal law. Western Australia's assisted dying law explicitly states that voluntary assisted dying is not suicide.

In Tasmania in 2005 a nurse was convicted of assisting in the death of her elderly father, who had terminal cancer, and trying to kill her mother, who was in the early stages of dementia. She was sentenced to two and a half years in jail but the judge later suspended the conviction because he believed the community did not want the woman jailed. This sparked debate about decriminalising euthanasia. Decriminalisation of euthanasia in Australia is supported by multiple minor parties such as Jacqui Lambie Network, the Science Party, Australian Greens, the Secular Party of Australia, the Reason Party and the Liberal Democratic Party. Though it is usually a conscience vote for the major parties such as the Australian Labor Party and Liberal/National Coalition.

In 2009 Shirley Justins and Caren Jennings, were found guilty of manslaughter and accessory to manslaughter respectively for providing Nembutal to former pilot Graeme Wylie in 2006. Justins stated that Wylie wanted to "die with dignity". The prosecution argued that Graeme Wylie did not have the mental capacity to make the crucial decision to end his life, classing it as involuntary euthanasia.

Exit International made TV ads arguing for voluntary euthanasia, which were banned just before they were scheduled to broadcast in September 2010. The following year the Supreme Court of New South Wales gave a two-year suspended sentence to a 66-year-old man who had facilitated the death of his long-term 78-year-old partner by helping her overdose on drugs and suffocating her. The deceased suffered from severe pain arising from a spinal condition. Furthermore, the deceased had expressed a wish to die in a suicide note written prior to her death. The court convicted the man of manslaughter. The court accounted for the accused's substantial impairment at the time the act was committed as well the fact that he voluntarily revealed his involvement in the commission of the offence.

As of November 2014, 29 bills had been presented in Australian parliaments that sought to legalise access to voluntary euthanasia or physician-assisted dying.

An omission to provide life-sustaining medical treatment is lawful in Australia, unless the patient is deemed mentally incapable of consent.

Federal law
As euthanasia is not a legislative power granted to the Federal Parliament under Section 51 of the Constitution of Australia, federal law cannot explicitly legalise or criminalise the practice. The subject is a matter for state parliaments.

Euthansia Laws Act 1997

Despite the power to legislate for euthanasia being held by the states, under Section 122 of the Constitution of Australia the Federal Parliament has the power to override any law passed by a territory parliament. This occurred in 1997, when the Federal Parliament passed the Euthanasia Laws Act 1997, originally introduced as a private member's bill by Liberal MP Kevin Andrews. The legislation passed the Senate by 38 votes to 33 in March 1997, having previously passed the House of Representatives by 88 votes to 35 in December 1996. The law amended the Northern Territory (Self-Government) Act 1978 and Australian Capital Territory (Self-Government) Act 1988 to explicitly prevent the Northern Territory Parliament and Australian Capital Territory Legislative Assembly from legislating to allow euthanasia or assisted suicide. An identical ban was placed into the Norfolk Island Act 1979, which was later repealed as part of the abolition of self-government on Norfolk Island by the Abbott Government in 2015. As well as removing the power of those territories to legalise euthanasia, the Act specifically repealed the provisions of the Rights of the Terminally Ill Act 1995 (NT), which had previously been passed by the Northern Territory Parliament and allowed euthanasia to occur in the territory in the intervening period.

Restoring Territory Rights (Assisted Suicide Legislation) Bill 2015 
Over the following 20 years there were nine bills introduced to the parliament to repeal Andrews' legislation, though at no point did any repeal legislation come to a vote on the floor of either chamber of parliament. In 2018 Liberal Democratic Party Senator David Leyonhjelm re-introduced a bill into the Senate to remove the federal ban on the ACT and Northern Territory legislating for euthanasia. Leyonhjelm's bill was given priority in the Senate after he secured the Turnbull Government's agreement for a conscience vote in the Senate and possibly the House of Representatives (the question of the government permitting a vote in the House was unresolved), in exchange for his support to reinstate the Australian Building and Construction Commission. The Liberal/National Government, opposition Labor Party and several minor party crossbenchers held a conscience vote on the legislation. Despite Leyonhjelm expressing optimism for the bill's prospects, it was defeated in the Senate by 36 votes to 34.

Restoring Territory Rights Act 2022
The Euthanasia Laws Act remained in effect, even as all six state parliaments passed their own versions of assisted dying legislation between 2017 and 2022. The former Morrison Government rejected requests by the Australian Capital Territory (ACT) and Northern Territory governments to repeal the law. The Albanese Government, elected in May 2022, endorsed a conscience vote on repeal legislation that was introduced by Labor MPs Luke Gosling and Alicia Payne on 1 August 2022. The bill, titled the Restoring Territory Rights Bill 2022, removed the sections of the federal self-government acts for the ACT and Northern Territory that prevented those legislatures from passing euthanasia laws. It did not restore the Northern Territory's euthanasia law that was nullified by the federal parliament in 1997. Debate of the bill was prioritised by the government, and was approved by 99 votes to 37 in the House of Representatives on 3 August 2022. The bill passed its second reading in the Senate on 24 November 2022 by 41 votes to 25. It passed its third reading in the Senate on 1 December 2022, with no division called. The legislation received royal assent on 13 December 2022 and took immediate effect.

State and territory laws

Summary of Current Laws

Past Laws

New South Wales 
On 21 September 2017 National Party MLC Trevor Khan introduced the Voluntary Assisted Dying Bill 2017 into the New South Wales Parliament. The Bill was modelled on the Oregon Death With Dignity Act, and was developed by a cross party working group that considered 72 "substantial" submissions. The Bill contained what advocates labelled a "raft of safeguards" including a seven-person oversight board to review all assisted deaths. The upper house debated the bill throughout several sittings in November 2017, and on 16 November the bill was voted down 20 votes to 19.

In October 2021 independent MLA Alex Greenwich introduced the Voluntary Assisted Dying Bill into the lower house of the Parliament. The legislation was subjected to a cross-party conscience vote, after Premier and Liberal Party leader Dominic Perrottet indicated he would grant Liberal members a conscience vote. The legislation was passed in the Legislative Assembly on 26 November 2021 by 52 votes to 32, and proceeded to the Legislative Council. The bill passed the Legislative Council by 23 votes to 15 on 19 May 2022,  with amendments attached, that were agreed to by the Assembly that same day. The legislation received royal assent on 27 May 2022, and will go into effect 18 months thereafter.

Under the provisions of the legislation, a person may make a request for a voluntary assisted death to a specialist doctor, which is lodged with the Voluntary Assisted Dying Board. If the doctor is satisfied that the person has the capacity to make the decision and is doing so voluntarily and determines that the person meets the criteria (i.e: they have a terminal illness that will result in death within six months, or a neurodegenerative condition that wil result in death within 12 months, and whose suffering is such that it creates a painful condition that cannot be tolerably relieved), they can approve the request. The same process must then be followed by a second independent doctor. The person may then make a written request declaring their intention to end their life, which must be witnessed by two people and then be submitted to the board. A final request must be made five days later and a review done by the first doctor, who can then apply to the Voluntary Assisted Dying Board to allow access to a substance to end their patient's life. The person may administer the relevant substance themselves or have a health practitioner do it.

Northern Territory 
Euthanasia was legalised in Australia's Northern Territory, by the Rights of the Terminally Ill Act 1995. It passed the Northern Territory Legislative Assembly by a vote of 15 to 10. In August 1996 a repeal bill was brought before the Parliament but was defeated by 14 votes to 11. The law was later voided by the federal Euthanasia Laws Act 1997, which is a federal law that was in effect until 13 December 2022 and prevented parliaments of territories (Specifically the Northern Territory, the Australian Capital Territory and Norfolk Island) from legalising euthanasia or assisted dying. Before the federal override occurred, three people died through physician assisted suicide under the legislation, aided by Dr Philip Nitschke. The first person was a carpenter, Bob Dent, who died on 22 September 1996.

Queensland 
In November 2018, the Premier of Queensland, Annastacia Palaszczuk, launched an inquiry considering the possible legalisation of voluntary assisted dying in the state. The inquiry also took into account care of the aged, end of life, and palliative care.

In May 2021, Palaszczuk announced that voluntary assisted dying legislation would be introduced to the Queensland Parliament for consideration. The bill would allow euthanasia, if the patient meets the following criteria:

 Has an eligible condition that is advanced and progressive, with the potential for death within the subsequent 12 months;
 Is capable of making a decision with sound mind;
 Is acting voluntarily and without coercion;
 Is at least 18 years old; and
 Is a resident of Australia and has lived in Queensland for at least twelve months.

On 16 September 2021, the Queensland Legislative Assembly passed the Voluntary Assisted Dying Act 2021 with 61 votes in favour and 31 opposed. The legislation was subject to a conscience vote. It received royal assent on 23 September 2021 went into effect on 1 January 2023.

South Australia 
In November 2016, the South Australian House of Assembly narrowly rejected a private member's bill which would have legalised a right to request voluntary euthanasia in circumstances where a person is in unbearable pain and suffering from a terminal illness. The bill was the first ever euthanasia bill to pass a second reading stage (27 votes to 19) though the bill was rejected during the clauses debate of the bill (23 votes all, with the Speaker's casting vote against the bill).

In late June 2021, a voluntary euthanasia bill similar to that of other states passed the Parliament of South Australia. The legislation mirrors most of the provisions of the Victorian law, though also allows private hospitals and individual practitioners to conscientiously object from participating in the scheme, provided they refer patients to a place where they can access the scheme. Residents in aged care and retirement villages can also access the scheme in their own homes or units. The Voluntary Assisted Dying Act 2021 went into effect on 31 January 2023.

Tasmania 
Tasmania came close to legalising voluntary euthanasia in November 2013, when a Greens-initiated voluntary euthanasia bill was narrowly defeated in the House of Assembly by a vote of 13–12. The bill would have allowed terminally ill Tasmanians to end their lives 10 days after making three separate requests to their doctor. Although both major parties allowed a conscience vote, all ten Liberals voted against the legislation, with Labor splitting seven in favour and three against, and all five Greens voting in favour.

In December 2019, independent Legislative Council member Mike Gaffney announced he would introduce a private member's bill to legalise voluntary assisted dying the following year. The End of Life Choices (Voluntary Assisted Dying) Bill was introduced to the Council on 27 August and was passed on 10 November 2020, without a formal vote being recorded. It proceeded to the Legislative Assembly, where it was passed with amendments attached on 4 March 2021 by 16 votes to 6. After the Council approved of the Assembly's amendments, the legislation received royal assent on 22 April 2021. The legislation went into effect on 23 October 2022.

Under the provisions of the legislation, in order to access the scheme a person must be at least 18 years of age, have decision-making capacity, be acting voluntarily and be suffering intolerably from a medical condition that is advanced, incurable, irreversible and will cause the person's death in the next six months, or 12 months for neurodegenerative disorders. The person must also be an Australian citizen or have resided in the country for at least three continuous years, and for at least 12 months in Tasmania immediately before making their first request. In total three separate requests must be made to access the scheme, each of which comes with progressively more stringent checks and balances.

Victoria 

Since 19 June 2019, Victoria permits assisted dying. On 20 September 2017, the Voluntary Assisted Dying Bill 2017 was introduced into the Victorian Parliament by the Andrews Labor Government, permitting assisted suicide. The bill was modelled on the recommendations of an expert panel chaired by former Australian Medical Association president Professor Brian Owler. The bill passed the parliament, with amendments made in the Legislative Council, on 29 November 2017. The upper house voted in favour 22 votes to 18. The lower house voted in favour 47 votes to 37. In passing the bill, Victoria became the first state to legislate for voluntary assisted dying (VAD). The law received royal assent on 5 December 2017 and came into effect on 19 June 2019. Implementation of the legislation was an ongoing process which took approximately 18 months. Challenges identified with implementation which were by noted by the Medical Journal of Australia included restricting access to those who were eligible, while ensuring it did not unfairly prevent those who were eligible from accessing it and translating the legislation into appropriate clinical practice, as well as supporting and managing doctors with conscientious objections.

Under the provisions of the legislation, assisted suicide (otherwise referred to as voluntary assisted dying) may be available in Victoria under the following conditions: 
 A person must be suffering from an incurable, advanced and progressive disease, illness or medical condition, and experiencing intolerable suffering.
 The condition must be assessed by two medical practitioners to be expected to cause death within six months (an exception exists for a person suffering from a neurodegenerative condition, where instead the condition must be expected to cause death within 12 months).
 A person must be over the age of 18 and have lived in Victoria for at least 12 months and have decision-making capacity. 
 Though mental illness or disability are not grounds for access, people who meet all other criteria and who have a disability or mental illness will not be denied access to assisted dying.

Other processes and safeguards associated with the scheme are in place.

Western Australia 

In November 2018 the McGowan Government announced it would introduce an assisted dying bill early in the new year.

On 10 December 2019, the Voluntary Assisted Dying Act 2019 passed the Western Australian Parliament. The legislation had passed the Legislative Council by 24 votes to 11, having previously passed the Legislative Assembly 45 votes to 11. Under the legislation, an eligible person would have to be terminally ill with a condition that is causing intolerable suffering and is likely to cause death within six months, or 12 months for a neurodegenerative condition. The person would have to make two verbal requests and one written request, with each request signed off by two independent doctors. Self-administration of lethal medication is then permitted, though in a departure from the Victorian system, a patient can choose for a medical practitioner to administer the drug. The legislation goes into effect on a day to be fixed by proclamation, though the government has advised of an 18-month implementation period. The law went into effect on 1 July 2021.

Organisations 
The euthanasia advocacy group YourLastRight.com is the peak organisation nationally representing the "Dying with Dignity" associations of Queensland, New South Wales, Victoria and Tasmania, as well as the South Australian Voluntary Euthanasia Society (SAVES), the Western Australian Voluntary Euthanasia Society (WAVES) and the Northern Territory Voluntary Euthanasia Society (NTVES).

Exit International is an Australian euthanasia advocacy group founded by Philip Nitschke. Other Australian groups include Christians Supporting Choice for Voluntary Euthanasia and Doctors for Voluntary Euthanasia Choice.

Australian institutions and organisations that oppose the legalisation of euthanasia include the Australian Medical Association, HOPE, Right to Life Australia and the Australian Catholic Church. A contemporary catholic viewpoint is available in a 2020 moral compass style document, expanding on the theme of the parable of the Good Samaritan.

See also 

 Health care in Australia
 Oregon Death With Dignity Act
 California End of Life Option Act
 Voluntary Assisted Dying Act 2017 (Victoria)
 Voluntary Euthanasia Party
 Euthanasia in New Zealand

Notes

References

Further reading 

Victoria's hub for health services and business - Voluntary Assisted Dying Bill